Kirk Douglas (born 24 June 1984), better known by his stage name Kirk Diamond is a Jamaican-Canadian Reggae and Dancehall singer-songwriter, producer and entrepreneur based in Brampton, Ontario.

Early life
Diamond was born Kirk Douglas in Spanish Town, Jamaica. He immigrated to Canada with his family in the 1990s at the age of ten.

Music career
 In 2010 Diamond joined the Dancehall music group Don Dem. Don Dem released two projects. In 2011, "Loaded Mixtape"  and In 2013 "The ReMixtape". In 2014 Kirk Collaborated with "T.G." a.k.a "Tommy Gunn" to release the single, Dem Nuh Real under the "Armzhouse" label in "Jamaica".

In 2015, Kirk and Bob Da Builda of Don Dem were nominated for a Juno Award for the single Love Inna We Heart which was produced by France based "Galang Records". In 2016 he traveled to Jamaica to collaborate with Derrick Morgan on a remake of the latter's 1960s song "Conqueror".

With high anticipation for the release of Diamond's solo debut EP entitled,Greater. Kirk flew to the UK to promote the project in 2017. The final stop on the media run was to BBC Radio 1Xtra where he joined Seani B on his program. What was to be a normal interview, ended up being much more when Kirk delivered a well-received freestyle. After returning to Canada, Kirk took on the festival circuit starting with the Grace Jerk Festival in Toronto, and the Reggaefest in Calgary, Alberta.

In 2018 the EP, "Greater" won the Juno Award for Reggae Recording of the Year. 2018 is also when Diamond would emerge as one of the most sought after performers in Canada, performing at over 72 shows including the "Love Thy Labourer festival" in Norfolk, Ontario and the Jambana Festival where Kirk would open for the legendary Third World Band.

References

External link
 Kirk Diamond Music

Jamaican reggae musicians
Jamaican emigrants to Canada
Canadian reggae musicians
People from Spanish Town
Musicians from Brampton
Juno Award for Reggae Recording of the Year winners
Living people
1984 births